Christopher Stanley (born December 1965) is an American film and television actor.  He appeared in the Ben Affleck-directed film Argo  and in Zero Dark Thirty.

His most notable TV role was as politician Henry Francis, the second husband of Betty Francis (January Jones) on Mad Men. Stanley's role on Mad Men was recurring in the third and fourth seasons and a main cast member from the fifth season forward.

Filmography

Film

Television

References

External links 
 
 AMC Season 4 Interview
 AMC Season 5 Interview
 AMC Season 6 Interview
 Vulture Interview
 GQ.com Interview

Living people
American male film actors
American male television actors
Male actors from Rhode Island
Actors from Providence, Rhode Island
20th-century American male actors
21st-century American male actors
1965 births